Kosi Bay is a series of four interlinked lakes in the Maputaland area of KwaZulu-Natal, South Africa.

Ecology
The lakes form part of the iSimangaliso Wetland Park, a UNESCO World Heritage Site.
Kosi Bay estuary is only  from the Mozambique border. It is possible to walk from the estuary to Ponta do Ouro in only an hour or so. It is one of the quietest beaches in South Africa. The Kosi River Mouth is known as "the aquarium" because of the clarity of the water and the abundance of fish species.

Bird species in the area include the palm-nut vulture, Pel's fishing owl, white-backed night-heron, and kingfishers. Duiker, hippopotamus, crocodiles and bull sharks are also present, and  loggerhead and endangered leatherback sea turtles lay their eggs on the beach. The Bay is noted for its aggressive bull shark population. The sharks are locally known as zambesi. Whale sharks and manta rays also visit the area. Whale watching to target mainly humpback whales and dolphins is a growing industry in Kosi Bay region.

The Kosi palm has the largest leaf of any plant. Endemic species include the Kosi cycad and Kosi fern. It is one of very few places on earth where five different species of mangrove trees are found in one area.

History

Kosi Bay is the cultural capital of the ancient Tsonga Tembe kingdom. This is the original and natural home of the Tsonga people and their fish traps. The history of Vatsonga people on this land dates back some 1000 years. Kosi Bay and Maputo Bay can be considered one land-area, traditionally belonging to the Africans. Kosi Bay was also known as Tembeland or Thongaland, but the name fell into disuse in early 1900s. When Britain colonised South Africa, Kosi Bay was annexed to Natal, while Maputo was annexed to Mozambique.

Tourism 
Several tourism operators offer experiences in the area, including guided or self-sustained hikes along trails that offer the opportunity to experience the ecosystem up close, walking across sand dunes, along pristine beaches and through coastal forest.

References

External links
 Ezemvelo KZN Wildlife (previous known as Natal Parks Board)
 Tholulwazi Uzivikele an NGO in the area working on HIV and poverty relief programs
 SANParks

Ramsar sites in South Africa
Protected areas of KwaZulu-Natal
Mozambique–South Africa border crossings